Stenogyne bifida is a rare species of flowering plant in the mint family known by the common name twocleft stenogyne. It is endemic to Hawaii, where it is known only from the island of Molokai. In 2010, there was only a single individual remaining in the wild; this is a seedling. It is a federally listed endangered species of the United States.

This plant is a climbing, trailing perennial vine. It produces yellow-green to brownish flowers. It grows in disturbed forest habitat dominated by Metrosideros polymorpha. The area has a large population of feral pigs that damage the habitat. The plant also faces competition from introduced plant species such as molasses grass, holly fern, thimbleberry and Christmasberry.

References

bifida
Endemic flora of Hawaii
Biota of Molokai
Plants described in 1888